The Waterloo Warriors men's basketball team represents the University of Waterloo in the Ontario University Athletics (OUA) of U Sports men's basketball. The Warriors have won the Wilson Cup, awarded to the OUA champions, 6 times: from 1974 to 1977, in 1983 and most recently in 1986. In addition, they have been awarded the W. P. McGee Trophy national championship trophy once, in 1975.

History 
The Warrior's basketball program was founded shortly after the university's inception in 1957 and has participated in every season since. Below is the team's regular season record since the 1999–2000 season.

Season-by-season Record

Rivalries 
The team, like all other sports teams at the university, have a rivalry with the nearby Wilfrid Laurier Golden Hawks, also located in Waterloo. They are both located on University Avenue within just over 1 kilometre of each other. The matchup between the two teams in any varsity sport is often titled and advertised as "The Battle of Waterloo", in reference to the 17th century Battle of Waterloo. Since 2011, the men's basketball teams have gone head-to-head a total of 22 times, with the Warriors winning 4 times and the Golden Hawks winning 18 times.

References

External links
 

1957 establishments in Ontario
Sports clubs established in 1957
Sport in Waterloo, Ontario
U Sports men's basketball
University of Waterloo
Waterloo Warriors